Silvia Toffano (born 5 January 1985) is an Italian ice hockey player. She competed in the women's tournament at the 2006 Winter Olympics.

References

External links

 

1985 births
Living people
Italian women's ice hockey players
Olympic ice hockey players of Italy
Ice hockey players at the 2006 Winter Olympics
Sportspeople from Venice